The Rybnik Coal Area (ROW) is an industrial region in southern Poland. It is located in the Silesian Voivodeship, in a basin between the Vistula and Oder rivers, sited on the Rybnik Plateau between Katowice (Upper-Silesian Metropolis) to the north and Ostrava on the south-west. It is part of the Silesian metropolitan area populated by 5,294,000 people and the Silesian metropolitan region   populated by about 7 million. According to scientific description by Paweł Swianiewicz and Urszula Klimska this area has 507,000 people, according to European Spatial Planning Observation Network - 634,000 people (525,000 + 109,000 by Racibórz). Area: about 1,300 km².

Main cities
Adjacent main cities and statistics (30.06.2009):

Area 

Adjacent county (powiat) and statistics (30.06.2009):

See also
 Metropolitan areas in Poland
Upper Silesian Industrial Region

References

External links
Rybnik Area on maps.google.com

Silesian Voivodeship
Metropolitan areas of Poland
Mining in Poland